Edinburgh Pentlands is a constituency of the Scottish Parliament (Holyrood) covering part of the council area of Edinburgh. It elects one Member of the Scottish Parliament (MSP) by the plurality (first past the post) method of election. It is one of nine constituencies in the Lothian electoral region, which elects seven additional members, in addition to the nine constituency MSPs, to produce a form of proportional representation for the region as a whole.

The seat has been held by Gordon MacDonald of the Scottish National Party since the 2011 Scottish Parliament election.

Electoral region

The other eight constituencies of the Lothian region are Almond Valley, Edinburgh Central, Edinburgh Eastern, Edinburgh Northern and Leith, Edinburgh Southern, Edinburgh Western, Linlithgow and Midlothian North and Musselburgh

The region includes all of the City of Edinburgh council area, parts of the East Lothian council area, parts of the Midlothian council area and all of the West Lothian council area.

Constituency boundaries and council area

Edinburgh is represented in the Scottish Parliament by six constituencies: Edinburgh Central, Edinburgh Eastern, Edinburgh Northern and Leith, Edinburgh Pentlands, Edinburgh Southern and Edinburgh Western.

The Edinburgh Pentlands constituency was created at the same time as the Scottish Parliament, in 1999, with the name and boundaries of an  existing Westminster constituency. In 2005, however, Scottish Westminster (House of Commons) constituencies were mostly replaced with new constituencies.

The newly formed Edinburgh Pentlands uses the following electoral wards:

In full: Pentland Hills, Colinton/Fairmilehead
In part: Sighthill/Gorgie shared with (Edinburgh Central)

Members of the Scottish Parliament

Election results

2020s

2010s

2000s

1990s

See also
 Politics of Edinburgh

Footnotes

External links

Constituencies of the Scottish Parliament
Constituencies in Edinburgh
1999 establishments in Scotland
Constituencies established in 1999
Scottish Parliament constituencies and regions 1999–2011
Scottish Parliament constituencies and regions from 2011